The Maritime Volunteer Service (MVS) is a United Kingdom wide charity (Charity No: 1048454 SCO No: SC039269 Registered Company No: 3003565), which has as its motto: "Supporting YOUR Community with OUR People" (strapline updated February 2021 from 'We change lives' (through training and serving local communities)).

To achieve this objective it recruits volunteers from all walks of life (from 18 to 80) to train across four branches of Seamanship, Engineering, Operations (Operational Support) and Community Response. It provides afloat experience to youth organisations and supports port and river authorities around the country.

HRH Prince Michael of Kent GCVO, KStJ, CD is the charity's Royal Patron and Honorary Commodore.

At a reception held at Cayzer House on Tuesday 6th September 2022, former First Sea Lord and Chief of the Naval Staff Admiral, The Rt Hon. The Lord West of Spithead GCB DSC PC was installed as Honorary President of the Maritime Volunteer Service.

Aims and Objectives
The MVS objects are:
To advance the education and training of the members of the charity and the general public in all aspects of maritime and communication skills and knowledge.
The protection and preservation of life and property primarily, but not exclusively, within the maritime environment.

Operations
The Maritime Volunteer Service has around 400 members in 27 units around the United Kingdom.

Most units meet weekly for training, which is put into practice afloat using a range of craft including RIBs, launches, dories, and the national training vessel East Sussex 1.

The MVS maintains strong links with local authorities, harbour boards, and other maritime organisations.

Structure

National level

At a National level the MVS Headquarters (MVS HQ) are based in Warrington at the International Business Centre.
All decisions on policy or national regulation are formulated by the directors and trustees.
Under the stewardship of the chairman, they also oversee the governance of the charitable aspects of the MVS.
 
The MVS is headed operationally by the Chief Volunteer Officer (CVO).
The CVO also takes the reports of the national managers and coordinators, including:
	MVS Training Manager: Responsible for all  training matters.
	MVS Resilience Manager: Responsible for liaison nationally and regionally to develop and implement resilience strategies and co-ordinate efforts in community support.
	MVS Communications Manager: oversees the national communications, including web content and social media.
	MVS National Health & Safety Advisor oversees all aspects of matters health & safety.
	MVS National Fleet Manager: Responsible for craft management group.
	MVS National Registrar: Responsible for maintaining membership records and subscriptions and matters relating to data protection.

Area Level

The country is divided into four areas which are: Northern England, Southern England, Central England (incorporating Wales and Northern Ireland), and Scotland.
Each area has an Area Volunteer Officer (AVO).
In addition to the AVO each area may have: a Deputy Area Officer (D/AVO) who assists the Area Volunteer Officer and an Area Specialist Officers (ASO) who offers advice and guidance on matters such as operations, seamanship or engineering.

Regional Level

Each area is subdivided into distinct regions.

Each region has a Regional Volunteer Officer (RVO).

The RVO is elected every three years by the units within their region.

Each region may also have a Deputy Regional Volunteer Officer (D\RVO).

Some regions have Regional Specialist Officers (RSO) responsible for overseeing various specialisations at the regional level.

Unit level

Each unit is led by a Head of Unit (HoU), who is elected annually by their peers.
The HoU is assisted by a Deputy Head of Unit (DHoU) who serves as the unit's second in command.

The current units across the UK, include:
	MVS Bangor (Northern Ireland): HoU Derek Gilbert 
	MVS Bristol: HoU Mike Angwin
	MVS Cardiff City: PvO  David Hankins 
	MVS Christchurch & Bournemouth: HoU Greg Lustig
	MVS East Sussex Sovereign Harbour:HoU  Greg Darby 
       MVS Fleetwood: HoU (VO)  Kevin Gray 
	MVS Gosport & Fareham: HoU (VO) Stuart Harrison 
	MVS Humber: HoU (VO)  Shayne Arnold 
	MVS Isle of Wight: HoU (VO)  David Dobson 
	MVS Medway: HoU (VO) Tim Corthorn
	MVS Menai Bridge: Giles 
	MVS Northumbria:Angela Carrington
	MVS Poole: HoU Gill Hale
	MVS Portsmouth (Founder Unit): HoU Martyn Sharp
       MVS Putney 
       MVS Dundee: HoU Gareth   Norman  
	MVS Rushden: HoU Andrew Smith 
	MVS Severn: HoU Nic Price
	MVS Swansea: Ho Paul Joseph
	MVS THANET: HoU (VO)  Les Miller

History of the Charity

The MVS was formed on 1 April 1994, a day after the Royal Naval Auxiliary Service (RNXS) was disbanded. The RNXS had operated small ships such as fleet tenders and inshore minesweepers, and ran Naval Control of shipping centres ashore, but was disbanded following the end of the Cold War. While many of the best aspects of RNXS operating procedures and traditions survive in the MVS, it is a uniformed civilian charity whose vessels fly a defaced Red Ensign.

There are many former Royal Navy personnel in the MVS, and constructive links with the Royal Navy continue at many levels, including University RN Units.

MVS volunteers assisted during the MSC Napoli salvage, playing a significant role ashore and afloat.

MVS also had a supporting role during the 2012 Summer Olympics, when its London Units were involved in an extended deployment as part of the Environment Agency's security operation for the Olympic Rowing and Kayak Sprint events held at Eton Dorney Lake. The City of London Unit's Nelson 45 launch, Londinium 1, and three RIBs were based at Boveney Lock on the non-tidal Thames for two weeks. The MVS craft had the privilege of being invited to take part in celebratory processions for Team GB's many gold medal winners down the river, from the Olympic Venue to Team GB's riverside hotel.

The MVS also assisted Weymouth Harbour Authority during the Olympics. Poole Unit's ex-Customs launch, Avocet, and RIBs from Portsmouth, Christchurch, Bournemouth, Weymouth, and Portland Units worked to the Weymouth Harbour Master's instructions, patrolling the port's busy anchorages and approaches. The MVS's national training vessel East Sussex 1 sailed to Weymouth to act as a floating hotel and control centre for the crews of the other craft. The MVS's work supporting the Olympics was one of the major factors that led to it receiving the Queen's Diamond Jubilee Volunteering Award 2012.

In 2014 the MVS marked its 20th Anniversary at an official dinner in Portsmouth, where the guest of honour was Vice-Admiral Sir Alan Massey KCB, CBE, RN Chief Executive of the MCA.

Recognition
On 7 May 1997, the then Armed Forces Minister, Dr John Reid, announced during a visit to the Britannia Royal Naval College, Dartmouth that the Royal Navy would give formal recognition to the Maritime Volunteer Service. In his remarks, he said that the Royal Navy's recognition is a tribute to the important role that the MVS play in the education and training of young people in nautical skills.

In January 2016 the First Sea Lord, Admiral Sir Philip Jones KCB ADC, issued a new Defence Instruction and Notice again recognising the MVS.

The Defaced Ensign

On 2 September 1998, a Warrant was issued giving permission for the MVS to wear a Red Ensign bearing the Service's "V" and "Anchor" logo and naval crown.
The logo was designed by Commander Bruce Nicholls OBE RN, and this is only the thirty-fifth designed Red Ensign approved for use worldwide.
Of that total six are flown by UK public institutions such as Trinity House, the RNLI and the Scout Association, six by dependent territories and five by Commonwealth countries and provinces.
The remainder have been granted to privileged yacht clubs around the world.
The MVS Ensign accurately reflects the Service's aims in promoting maritime skills amongst local communities in ports and harbours around Britain's coast.

Training
Each member is issued an individual training log book and members can train in variety of RYA courses including:
	RYA Basic Navigation and Safety Course
	RYA Day Skipper Theory Course
	RYA Coastal Skipper / Yachtmaster Offshore Theory Course
	RYA Diesel Engine Course
	RYA Marine Radio Short Range Certificate Course
	RYA First Aid

Members can also train with materials produced by the MVS covering:
	Safety at Sea
	Operation of Inboard and Outboard Motors
	Boat Handling
	Vessel Repair and Maintenance
	Chart Work and Navigation including use of navigation equipment
	Emergency Response such as pollution, incidents and afloat patrols
	Operations room skills including Command and Control
	Use of meteorological information
	Operation of craft electrical systems including fault diagnosis and rectification
	Large craft engines and auxiliary systems
	Control of berthing and berthing parties
	Small ship command and handling
	Deck and Engineering watch keeping

Members progress through the various levels in their own time dependent on the amount of time they can commit to their training.

References

External links
 Maritime Volunteer Service
 HRH Prince Michael of Kent – Patron List
 MVS Defaced Ensign
 Maritime Volunteer Service Registered Charity No.1048454

Maritime education
Organisations based in Cheshire
Organizations established in 1994
Portsmouth
Sea rescue organisations of the United Kingdom
1994 establishments in the United Kingdom
Warrington